Escapism Travel Magazine is a travel magazine based in New York City, United States.

Published twice a year, it has 250,000 readers, according to its corporate media kit.

Content
The magazine emphasizes luxury travel, eco-tourism and cultural heritage.

Articles offer information on new, emerging destinations, coastal tourism,  food, design, and style.

The magazine is published by SanMax Publishing.

References

External links
Official Website
Voyagers Travel

Tourism magazines
English-language magazines
Magazines established in 2008
Magazines published in New York City
2008 establishments in New York City
Biannual magazines published in the United States
Lifestyle magazines published in the United States